Skjolden is a village in the municipality of Luster in Vestland county, Norway.  It is located at the end of the Lustrafjorden, a branch of the Sognefjorden.  Skjolden is located at the innermost point of the Sognefjorden, Norway's longest fjord, and the length of the Sognefjorden is measured from Skjolden to the island of Ytre Sula where the fjord meets the ocean—over 200 km.  The valleys of Mørkridsdal and Fortunsdal meet at Skjolden, just west of the Hurrungane mountains.  Skjolden is home to about 200 people.

North of the village is Breheimen National Park, home of the glaciers Harbardsbreen and Spørteggbreen and the mountain Tverrådalskyrkja.

Notable people
The village was home to philosopher Ludwig Wittgenstein who lived here after 1913 during some periods of his life; the longest one was 13 months. Important parts of his works were written here. He had designed a small wooden house that was erected on a remote rock over the Eidsvatnet Lake in 1913 and called "Østerrike" (Austria) by locals. It was broken up in 1958 to be rebuilt in the village. A local foundation collected donations and bought the house in 2014; it was dismantled again and re-erected at its original location; the inauguration took place on 20 June 2019 under international attendance.

Media gallery

References

Villages in Vestland
Luster, Norway